Christian French (born March 17, 1997) is an American pop singer-songwriter based in Los Angeles. He grew up in Fishers, Indiana and learned to play piano by watching YouTube instructionals and in high school started posting song covers on SoundCloud.

Biography 
While a pre-med student at Indiana University, he started writing original music. After dropping out of college, he moved to Los Angeles and put out a few singles with producer Triegy, including their first track, "Fall for You", which charted on Spotify's U.S. Viral 50. He followed that with "By Myself", also a collaboration with Triegy, that earned over 50 million Spotify listens.

In 2018 he worked with Grammy-nominated producer Dru Decaro, and released his debut EP, natural colors and the single "Sweet Home". That same year he left college to tour with Chelsea Cutler on her Sleeping with Roses Tour. In 2019, French was a guest on Hoodie Allen's single "Come Around" and toured with Quinn XCII on the From Tour With Love spring tour.

That same year, Christian signed to Disruptor Records/Sony Music and released the 6-track EP bright side of the moon, ruminating on mental health and tales of romance. The single "Head First", produced by Andrew Luce, amassed more than 32 million Spotify spins and 2 million YouTube views. The accompanying video premiered on Billboard on June 18, 2020.

On January 17, 2020, the video for his track "time of our lives" premiered on Ones to Watch. In March 2020, Time magazine named his single, "crowded room", one of its Best New Songs of the Week and it appeared on Spotify's New Music Friday playlist. His next EP, Good Things Take Time, is scheduled for release in summer 2020. The first track from that release, "i think too much", was released in spring 2020.

Personal life 
Growing up, French was an avid hockey player. French played for local Indianapolis travel teams for much of his youth. During the 2013–2014 season, French was the captain of the Indiana Jr. Ice U16 AAA team that featured Logan Brown who was selected in the 2016 NHL Entry Draft 11th overall by the Ottawa Senators. In his three years at Indiana University, French would play for the Indiana University hockey team each year.

Discography

Remixes 

 head first (HALP remix) - 2020
 head first (Pink Slip x inverness remix) - 2020
 head first (Young Bombs remix) - 2020

References

1997 births
American male singer-songwriters
Living people
Singer-songwriters from Indiana